Maillart is a surname, and may refer to

 Aimé Maillart (1817–1871), French composer
 Ella Maillart (1903–1997), Swiss travel writer
 Robert Maillart (1872–1940), Swiss civil engineer

Surnames of French origin